The Mayor of Colchester sits as non-political chairman of Colchester Borough Council and serves as the civic representative of the borough. The mayoralty is customarily awarded to the most senior councillor of one of the political groups

Current Mayor
The new Mayor of Colchester - from late May 2022 - is Cllr Tim Young (Labour)

Colchester's Mayor from October 2020 was Councillor Robert Davison, a Conservative. Like his predecessor Cllr Nick Cope, Cllr Davidson held office for 18 months rather than the traditional year due to the coronavirus pandemic.

The role of Mayor
The mayor is the chief citizen and represents the borough throughout their year of office. The Mace, carried by the Town Serjeant on ceremonial occasions and into the council chamber, is the symbol of that authority.

The mayor sits as non-political chairman of the council. The mayoralty is customarily awarded to the most senior councillor of one of the political groups, who take it in turn. The nomination is only rarely challenged. The mayor serves for a year as Deputy Mayor.

The annual ceremony of the installation of a new mayor takes place each May, following the borough council elections. The mayor's election takes place at the first meeting of the newly formed council.

The council, officers and members of the public gather in the Moot Hall to welcome the incoming mayor who takes the oath administered by the Town Clerk.

The Mayor's Parlour
The Mayor's Parlour is the Colchester Town Hall office where the Mayor works, as well as the reception suite for visitors. The borough regalia (including The Mace), is also displayed there, and represents gifts to the town as well as items of the borough's heritage.

The Mayor's Charities
Throughout his/her year in office, the Mayor organises events to raise money for his/her charities ("The Mayor's Charities").

List of Colchester mayors

Post-1835
Mayors subsequent to the passing of the Municipal Corporation Act 1835.

2000–present
2022/23 Tim Young (Labour)
2020/22 Robert Davidson (Conservative) (from October 2020)
2019/20 Nick Cope (Liberal Democrat) (until October 2020)
2018/19 Peter Chillingworth (Conservative)
2017/18 Gerard Oxford (Highwoods Independent)
2016/17 Julie Young (Labour)
2015/16 Theresa Higgins (Liberal Democrats)
2014/15 John Elliott (Conservative)
2013/14 Colin Sykes (Liberal Democrat)
2012/13 Christopher Arnold (Conservative)
2011/12 Helen Chuah (Liberal Democrat)
2010/11 Sonia Lewis (Conservative)
2009/10 Henry Spyvee (Liberal Democrat)
2008/09 Margaret Fairley-Crowe (Conservative)
2008    Peter Crowe (Conservative) (died in office)
2007/08 Ray Gamble (Liberal Democrat)
2006/07 Richard H Gower (Conservative)
2005/06 Terry Sutton (Liberal Democrat)
2004/05 John Bouckley (Conservative)
2003/04 Chris Hall (Liberal Democrat)
2002/03 Nigel Chapman (Conservative)
2001/02 Mike Hogg (Liberal Democrat)
2000/01 Christopher Garnett (Conservative)

1990–1999
1999/2000 Martin Hunt (Liberal Democrat)
1998/99 David Cannon (Conservative)
1997/98 Jenny Stevens (Liberal Democrat)
1996/97 Wesley Sandford (Liberal Democrat)
1995/96 Mary Fairhead (Conservative)
1994/95 J Tony Webb (Tiptree Independent)
1993/94 Ivan Trusler (Liberal Democrat)
1992/93 Mary Frank (Labour)
1991/92 R Paul Spendlove (Conservative)
1990/91 Ken Cooke (Labour)

1980–1989
1989/90 John Sanderson (Conservative)
1988/89 Graham Bober (Labour) President of Colchester Co-operative Society and Branch President Colchester NGA. Printer's union
1987/88 John Lampon (Conservative)
1986/87 Bob Russell (SDP), MP for Colchester, 1997-2015
1985/86 J Williams (Conservative)
1984/85 Janet Fulford (Conservative)
1983/84 John Bird (Labour)
1982/83 Eric L W James (Conservative)
1981/82 Roger Browning (Conservative)
1980/81 Frank Wilkin (Labour)

1970–1979
1979/80 Cyril Sargeant (Conservative)
1978/79 David Holt (Conservative)
1977/78 L Woodrow (Labour)
1976/77 Joyce Brooks (Conservative)
1975/76 W Ladbrook (Labour)
1974/75 James Jackson
1973/74 Arthur Parsonson (Conservative)
1972/73 Walter Buckingham (Labour)
1971/72 A Smith
1970/71 J Richard Wheeler (Conservative)

1960–1969
1969/70 R Hilham (Conservative)
1968/69 C Howe (Labour)
1967/68 Edward Duffield
1966/67 C Pell
1965/66 S Wooster
1964/65 W Willingham
1963/64 R Harrison
1962/63 W Porter
1961/62 D Panton
1960/61 I Brown

1950–1959
1959/60 A Kay
1958/59 May Cook
1957/58 C Wheeler (Conservative)
1956/57 C Child (Labour)
1955/56 Alexander Craig (Conservative)
1954/55 T Morris
1953/54 Kathleen Sanders (Conservative)
1952/53 W Lee (Labour)
1951/52 H Reid
1950/51 J Andrews

1940–1949
1949/50 P Warwick Bailey
1948/49 Leonard Dansie
1947/48 Leonard Dansie
1946/47 L Worsnop
1945/46 H Thompson
1944/45 Arthur Piper
1943/44 Maurice Pye
1942/43 Percy Sanders
1941/42 Percy Sanders
1940/41 Percy Sanders

1930–1939
1939/40 Percy Sanders
1938/39 H H Fisher
1937/38 Alec Blaxill
1936/37 G C Benham
1935/36 F MacDonald-Docker
1934/35 Arthur Cross
1933/34 William Gurney Benham
1932/33 Maurice Pye
1931/32 George Hazell
1930/31 William Harper

1920–1929
1929/30 C Jolly (Labour)
1928/29 John Russell
1927/28 Ernest Turner
1926/27 Charles Smallwood
1925/26 Arthur Piper
1924/25 Catherine Reeve Hunt
1923/24 Catherine Alderton (Liberal)
1922/23 Percy Alan Sanders
1921/22 Wasey Chopping
1920/21 Arthur Lucking

1910–1919
1919/20 Owen Ward
1918/19 George Wright
1917/18 Arthur Jarmin
1916/17 John Bailey
1915/16 Allen Aldridge
1914/15 W Coats Hutton
1913/14 Wilson Marriage
1912/13 W Coats Hutton
1911/12 Reginald Beard
1910/11 Frank Cant

1900–1909
1909/10 Alec Blaxill
1908/09 William Gurney Benham
1907/08 Wilson Marriage
1906/07 Walter Sparling
1905/06 Henry Goody
1904/05 Edwin Sanders
1903/04 Ernest Barritt
1902/03 Henry H Elwes (Conservative)
1901/02 Wilson Marriage (Liberal)
1900/01 C Egerton-Green

1890–1899
1899/1900 E Thompson Smith
1898/99 Edwin J Sanders
1897/98 James Noah Paxman, founder of Davey, Paxman and Co
1896/97 H G Egerton-Green
1895/96 James Wicks
1894/95 C E Egerton-Green
1893/94 Henry Goody
1892/93 William Gurney Benham
1891/92 Wilson Marriage
1890/91 Lent J Watts

1880–1889
1889/90 Asher Prior
1888/89 Edwin J Sanders
1887/88 James Noah Paxman, founder of Davey, Paxman and Co
1886/87 H G Egerton-Green
1885/86 Henry Laver
1884/85 H J Gurdon-Rebow
1884 J Harvey
1883/84 Alfred Francis
1882/83 J Harvey
1881/82 J Harvey
1880/81 Samuel Chaplin

1870–1879
1879/80 John Kent
1878/79 Thomas Moy, coal merchant
1877/78 Thomas Moy, coal merchant
1876/77 John Bishop
1875/76 P Papillon
1874/75 John Bishop
1873/74 Edward Round
1872/73 John Bishop
1871/72 Charles Hawkins
1870/71 Charles Hawkins

1860–1869
1869/70 John Bishop
1868/69 Francis Smythies
1867/68 John Bishop
1866/67 PO Papillon
1865/66 Charles Hawkins
1864/65 John Bishop
1863/64 John Bishop
1862/63 Edward Williams
1861/62 Henry Wolton
1860/61 Francis Smythies

1850–1859
1859/60 Edward Williams
1858/59 Arthur Laing
1857/58 Peter Duncan
1856/57 Henry Wolton
1855/56 Joseph Cooke
1854/55 Edward Williams
1853/54 Henry Wolton
1852/53 Francis Smythies
1851/52 Arthur Laing
1850/51 Joseph Cooke

1840–1849
1849/50 Edward Williams
1848/49 Charles Hawkins 
1847/48 Henry Wolton
1846/47 William Bolton Smith
1845/46 Henry Wolton
1844/45 Henry Wolton
1843/44 Henry Vint
1842/43 Roger Nunn
1841/42 Henry Vint
1840/41 Thomas Turner

1836–1839
1839/40 Samuel Green Cooke
1838/39 George Bawtree
1837/38 Samuel Green Cooke
1836/37 John Chaplin
1836 George Savill

Pre-1835
Mayors prior to the passing of the Municipal Corporation Act 1835. (Source: Charles Benham.)

1830–1835
 1834 Roger Nunn
 1833 Win. Smith
 1832 Edward Clay (Greenstead)
 1831 William Sparling
 1830 William Smith

1820–1829
 1829 Edward Clay (Greenstead)
 1828 William Sparling
 1827 John Clay
 1826 Edward Clay (St. Leonard's)
 1825 John Clay
 1824 Samuel Clay
 1823 John Clay
 1822 William Smith
 1821 James Boggis
 1820 John Clay

1810–1819
 1819 Frincis Tillett Abell
 1818 William Argent
 1817 Edward Clay
 1816 William Argent
 1815 Edward Clay
 1814 John King
 1813 William Sparling
 1813 William Smith
 1812 John Bridge
 1811 Francis Smythies
 1810 Francis Tillett Abell

1800–1809
 1809 William Smith
 1808 Thomas Hedge
 1807 Thomas Hedge, junior
 1806 William Smith
 1805 William Sparling
 1804 Thomas Hedge
 1803 William Bunnell
 1802 William Phillips
 1801 Thomas Hedge
 1800 William Smith

1790–1799
 1799 Robert Hewes
 1798 William Phillips
 1797 Thomas Hedge
 1796 William Mason
 1795 William Bunnell, upholsterer and auctioneer
 1794 William Phillips
 1793 Newton Tills
 1792 Nathaniel Barlow
 1791 John Gibson
 1790 William Swinborne

1780–1789
 1789 Edmund Lilley
 1788 Bezaliel Angier
 1787 Edward Capstack, currier and tanner
 1786 William Argent
 1785 Edmund Lilley
 1784 Samuel Ennew
 1783 William Seabor
 1782 Stephen Betts
 1781 John King
 1780 Thomas Boggis

1770–1779
 1779 Thomas Clamtree, of Customs and Excise
 1778 John King
 1777 Thomas Clamtree, of Customs and Excise
 1776 Thomas Boggis
 1775 Thomas Clamtree, of Customs and Excise
 1775 John King
 1774 John Bakers
 1773 Thomas Clamtree, of Customs and Excise
 1772 Thomas Clamtree, of Customs and Excise
 1772 Thomas Bayles
 1771 Solomon Smith.
 1770 John King

1763–1769
 1769 Jordan Harris Lisle, apothecary
 1768 James Robjent
 1767 Samuel Ennew
 1766 Thomas Bayles
 1765 Thomas Wilshire
 1764 Henry Lodge
 1763 Thomas Clamtree, of Customs and Excise
 1740 to 1763: there being no Charter in existence, no Mayor could be appointed.

1730–1740
 1740 Jeremiah Daniell
 1740 G. Wegg, junior
 1739 John Blatch
 1738 Joseph Duffield, cardboardmaker
 1737 James Boys
 1736 Thomas Carew
 1735 John Blatch
 1734 Joseph Duffield, cardboardmaker
 1733 James Boys
 1732 Thomas Carew
 1731 John Blatch
 1730 Joseph Duffield, cardboardmaker

1720–1729
 1729 James Boys (or Boyce)
 1728 John Blatch
 1727 Sir Ralph Creffield, Kt, woollen draper
 1726 Matthew Martin
 1725 Jeremiah Daniell
 1724 Peter Johnson
 1723 Samuel Jarrold
 1722 Edmund Raynham
 1721 Arthur Winsley
 1720 Jeremiah Daniell

1710–1719
 1719 Thomas Grigson
 1719 Nathaniel Lawrence, junior
 1718 Robert Clark
 1717 Thomas Grigson
 1716 Sir Isaac Rebow, MP for Colchester 4 times between 1689 and 1722
 1715 Peter Johnson
 1714 George Clark
 1713 James Lawrence
 1712 Peter Johnson
 1711 James Lawrence
 1710 Nathaniel Lawrence, junior

1700–1709
 1709 Samuel Angier
 1709 Nathaniel Lawrence, senior, MP for Colchester, 1685
 1708 John Pepper
 1707 George Clark
 1706 James Lawrence
 1705 John Rainham
 1704 Nathaniel Lawrence, junior
 1703 Samuel Angier
 1702 Ralph Creffield, junior, woollen draper
 1701 Samuel Fetherstone
 1700 John Potter

1690–1699
 1699 William Francis
 1698 William Boys
 1697 Ralph Creffield, junior, woollen draper
 1696 Nathaniel Lawrence, junior
 1696 John Seabrook
 1695 John Beason
 1694 William Moore
 1693 Samuel Mott
 1692 John Stileman
 1691 John Seabrook
 1690 Benjamin Cock

1680–1689
 1689 John Potter
 1688 John Milbank
 1687 John Milbank
 1687 Alexander Hindmers
 1686 Samuel Mott
 1685 William Flannar
 1684 John Stilleman
 1683 Nathaniel Lawrence, senior
 1682 Thomas Greene
 1681 William Moor
 1680 Ralph Creffield, woollen merchant

1670–1679
 1679 Nathaniel Lawrence, senior
 1678 John Rayner
 1677 Ralph Creffield, woollen merchant
 1676 Thomas Greene
 1675 Alexander Hinmers
 1674 Henry Lambe
 1673 Ralph Creffield, woollen merchant
 1672 Nathaniel Lawrence, senior
 1671 John Rayner
 1670 William Moor

1660–1669
 1669 Henry Lambe
 1668 Ralph Creffield, woollen merchant
 1667 Andrew Fromanteele
 1666 William Flannar
 1665 Thomas Talbot
 1664 Thomas Wade
 1663 William Moor
 1662 Thomas Rennolds
 1662 Henry Lambe
 1661 John Milbank
 1660 John Gale

1650–1659
 1659 Thomas Peeke
 1659 Jonn Radhams
 1658 Henry Barrington
 1657 Nicholas Beason
 1656 John Vickers
 1655 Thomas Lawrence
 1654 Thomas Reynolds
 1653 Thomas Peeke
 1652 John Radhams
 1651 Richard Greene
 1650 John Furlie

1640–1649
 1649 Thomas Wade
 1648 Henry Barrington
 1647 William Cooke
 1646 John Langley
 1645 Robert Buxton
 1644 John Cox
 1643 Thomas Lawrence
 1642 Ralph Harrison
 1641 Thomas Wade
 1641 Henry Barrington
 1640 Robert Talcott

1635–1639
 1639 John Langley
 1638 John Firlie (or Furley.)
 1637 Henry Barrington
 1636 Robert Buxton
 1635 Daniel Cole

References

Colchester
Mayors of Colchester